The 71st Ordnance Group (EOD) ("Raptors") is one of three explosive ordnance disposal groups of the United States Army. On order, the group deploys and conducts operations in support of the Combative Commanders or other government agencies to counter CBRNE and Weapon of Mass Destruction threats.

Subordinate units
  71st Ordnance Group (EOD), Fort Carson
 Headquarters and Headquarters Detachment, Fort Carson
 3rd Ordnance Battalion (EOD) "Nighthawks", Joint Base Lewis-McChord
 Headquarters and Headquarters Company, Joint Base Lewis-McChord, Washington
 53d Ordnance Company (EOD), Yakima Training Center, Washington
 707th Ordnance Company (EOD) "Thunderbirds", Joint Base Lewis-McChord, Washington
 734th Ordnance Company (EOD), Fort Bliss, Texas
 741st Ordnance Company (EOD), Fort Bliss, Texas
 759th Ordnance Company (EOD), Fort Irwin, California
 787th Ordnance Company (EOD) "Sasquatches", Joint Base Lewis-McChord, Washington
 79th Ordnance Battalion (EOD), Fort Riley
 Headquarters and Headquarters Company, Fort Riley
 630th Ordnance Company (EOD), Fort Riley, KS
 704th Ordnance Company (EOD), Fort Hood, TX
 705th Ordnance Company (EOD), Fort Polk, LA
 752nd Ordnance Company (EOD), Fort Hood, TX
 761st Ordnance Company (EOD), Fort Sill, OK
 774th Ordnance Company (EOD), Fort Riley, KS
 797th Ordnance Company (EOD), Fort Hood, TX
 242nd Ordnance Battalion (EOD), Fort Carson
 Headquarters and Headquarters Company, Fort Carson
 62nd Ordnance Company (EOD), Fort Carson, CO
 749rd Ordnance Company (EOD), Fort Carson, CO
 764th Ordnance Company (EOD), Fort Carson, CO
 21st Ordnance Company (EOD), Kirtland Air Force Base

Lineage
 Constituted 17 July 1944, as HHD, 71st Ordnance Group
 Activated 23 July 1944 in France
 Inactivated 30 June 1946 in Germany
 Re-designated 17 February 1947 as HHD, 361st Ordnance Group,
 Activated 1 March 1947 at Atlanta, Georgia
 Reorganized and re-designated 27 April 1949 as Headquarters and Headquarters Company (HHC), 361st Ordnance Group
 Inactivated 30 April 1954 at Atlanta, Georgia
 Re-designated 19 April 1955 as HHC, 71st Ordnance Group
 Activated 13 May 1955 in Germany
 Reorganized and re-designated 20 November 1958 as HHD, 71st Ordnance Group
 Inactivated 24 June 1959 in Germany
 Re-designated 17 November 1962 as HHC, 71st Ordnance Group
 Activated 15 December 1962 in Korea
 Inactivated 1 January 1966 in Korea
 Activated 16 October 2005 as HHD, 71st Ordnance Group (EOD), Fort Carson Colorado

Honors

Campaign Participation Credit
World War II
Normandy
Northern France
Rhineland
Ardennes-Alsace
Central Europe
Operation Iraqi Freedom
Operation Enduring Freedom

Decorations
 Meritorious Unit Commendation (Army)
 Streamer Embroidered EUROPEAN THEATER
 Joint Meritorious Unit Awards (JMUA)

Notes

External links
Official Site: 71st Ordnance Group (EOD), archived copy

Ordnance 071
Military units and formations established in 1944
Explosive ordnance disposal units and formations
Ordnance units and formations of the United States Army